Edmilson da Silva Melo (born 2 June 1980) is a Brazilian former footballer who played as a forward.

Career
Edmilson played twice for Flamengo at 2002 Copa Libertadores. He also played for Brasiliense.

He and his brother Niberto came to Honduras to play for C.D. Marathón, leaving after one season due to tactical disagreements with Manuel Keosseian.  He also played for Pinheiros Futebol Clube in Espírito Santo.

He moved to the China League One club Hunan Billows in June 2010.

References

External links
 
Flamengo Game Record 
Flamengo 2002 season at Flamengo's Flapedia 

1980 births
Living people
Brazilian footballers
Brazilian expatriate footballers
CR Flamengo footballers
Real C.D. España players
C.D. Marathón players
C.D. Victoria players
Hunan Billows players
Villa Nova Atlético Clube players
Expatriate footballers in Honduras
Expatriate footballers in China
Brazilian expatriate sportspeople in China
Brazilian expatriate sportspeople in Honduras
China League One players
Liga Nacional de Fútbol Profesional de Honduras players
Association football forwards